Jimmie Robertson (July 1868 – 1950) was a Scottish footballer who played in the Football League for Manchester City and Stoke.

Career
Robertson began playing football for his local club Dundee before moving to English side Stoke in 1892. He had a fine debut season scoring eleven goals in 1892–93 helping Stoke to their highest league position to that point of 7th. He scored eight goals in 1893–94 but failed to add to his tally the following season and left for Manchester City where he scored twice in three matches.

Career statistics
Source:

References

Scottish footballers
Dundee F.C. players
Manchester City F.C. players
Stoke City F.C. players
1868 births
1950 deaths
English Football League players
Footballers from Dundee
Association football forwards